The Women's 4x200m Freestyle Relay event at the 11th FINA World Aquatics Championships swam 24 July 2001 in Fukuoka, Japan. Preliminary heats swam in the morning session, with the top-8 finishers advancing to swim again in the Final that evening.

In the final, the Australian team originally finished first, with the United States second, and Great Britain taking the bronze. However, soon after finishing, the American team was disqualified for an early changeover, and following that, the Australians were also disqualified for entering the pool before all other teams had finished. Both appealed their disqualifications, with America initially being reinstated due to video evidence. However, the original decisions were eventually upheld meaning that Great Britain took the gold medal, Germany the silver, and Japan the bronze.

At the start of the event, the World (WR) and Championship (CR) records were:
WR: 7:55.47 swum by East Germany on August 18, 1987 in Strasbourg, France.
CR: 7:57.96 swum by China on September 5, 1994 in Rome, Italy

Results

Final

Preliminaries

References

Swimming at the 2001 World Aquatics Championships
2001 in women's swimming